Club Deportivo Atlético Tordesillas is a Spanish football team based in Tordesillas, in the autonomous community of Castile and León. Founded in 1969, it plays in Tercera División RFEF – Group 8, holding home matches at Las Salinas, with a capacity of 3,500 seats.

History 
In the 2016-17 season the club finished 14th in the Tercera División, Group 8.

Already in a partnership agreement with the local professional club Real Valladolid, in August 2020 the two clubs made a formal arrangement for Atlético Tordesillas to function as a subsidiary team (below Real Valladolid Promesas), with the first team players and staff provided and controlled by Valladolid but  Tordesillas keeping the identity (badge, kit and stadium), as well as retaining control of the club structure in other areas. This arrangement ended one year later on mutual agreement, after Real Valladolid was relegated to Segunda División.

Season to season

16 seasons in Tercera División
1 season in Tercera División RFEF

Notes

Notable former players
 Luis Carlos

References

External links
Official website 
Futbolme.com profile 
elportaldelfutbol.es.tl profile

Football clubs in Castile and León
Association football clubs established in 1969
Divisiones Regionales de Fútbol clubs
1969 establishments in Spain
Spanish reserve football teams 
Real Valladolid
Province of Valladolid